Dargaite is a rare mineral with formula BaCa12(SiO4)4(SO4)2O3.  It is the barium-analogue of nabimusaite, also differing from it in the lack of fluorine. It is one of many recently approved new minerals coming from the Hatrurim complex. Dargaite, as nabimusaite, is trigonal (space group R-3m).

References

Silicate minerals
Sulfate minerals
Calcium minerals
Barium minerals
Trigonal minerals
Minerals in space group 166